A sick call, in the United States Military, is "a daily lineup of military personnel requiring medical attention" and a "signal [such as on a bugle] announcing the time for such a lineup".

As a record of treatment provided to personnel, one or more of the attending medical personnel will typically fill out a "Sick Call Treatment Record" for each patient seen.

Reference

Military medicine in the United States